Mammoth Yosemite Airport  is a town-owned public airport seven miles east of Mammoth Lakes, in Mono County, California, United States. Also known as Mammoth Lakes Airport or Mammoth–June Lake Airport, it is mainly used for general aviation, but has scheduled passenger flights operated by one airline which primarily serves the airport on a seasonal basis during the winter ski season.  Additional scheduled passenger service for the Mammoth area is seasonally available at the nearby Eastern Sierra Regional Airport located in Bishop, CA.

The airport had 665 passenger boardings (enplanements) in calendar year 2008, 6,157 enplanements in 2009, and 19,814 in 2010. The National Plan of Integrated Airport Systems for 2011–2015 categorized it as a general aviation airport.  However, the report for 2015-2019 upgraded this status to that of a primary/non-hub commercial airport.

Facilities
The airport covers 230 acres (93 ha) at an elevation of 7,135 feet (2,175 m). Its one runway, 9/27, is 7,000 by 100 feet (2,134 x 30 m) asphalt.

In 2010 the airport had 8,285 aircraft operations, average 22 per day: 68% general aviation, 20% air taxi, 12% airline, and <1% military. Three aircraft were then based at this airport, all single-engine.

Mammoth Yosemite Airport has a terminal development master plan that will expand operations, and will be able to accommodate bigger aircraft. The new terminal facilities will include a new terminal building itself, airline parking apron, a deicing apron, access roads, automobile parking facilities, maintenance facilities, and airport offices.

Historical airline service

Trans Sierra Airlines, a commuter air carrier, was serving the airport in 1971 with four daily flights to Los Angeles (LAX) and two daily flights to San Jose (SJC) operated with Cessna 402 twin prop aircraft. Trans Sierra then changed its name to Sierra Pacific Airlines which in 1972 was operating 44-passenger seat Convair 440 propliner service to Los Angeles (LAX) and Burbank (BUR). By the mid-1970s, Sierra Pacific Airlines was operating nonstop flights to Los Angeles (LAX), Las Vegas (LAS), Reno (RNO) and Fresno (FAT) as well as one stop direct service to Burbank (BUR) with Convair 580 turboprops and Handley Page Jetstream commuter propjets. Some Sierra Pacific flights made an intermediate stop at the Eastern Sierra Regional Airport located in nearby Bishop while en route to other destinations. Sierra Pacific had ceased all service into the airport by the end of 1979. 

In 1980 and 1981, Air Sierra was flying nonstop to Fresno (FAT) with continuing direct service to Lake Tahoe (TVL) with Piper Navajo twin prop aircraft. Also in 1981, Wings West Airlines operating as an independent commuter air carrier was operating nonstop flights to Santa Monica (SMO), Oakland (OAK) and Sacramento (SMF) with Cessna 402 twin prop aircraft. Wings West then ceased serving Mammoth Lakes and subsequently became an American Eagle Airlines affiliate in California. By 1983, Mojave Airlines was operating flights to Los Angeles (LAX), San Diego (SAN), Ontario (ONT), Inyokern (IYK) and Fox Field (WJF) in Lancaster with Beechcraft C99 turboprops. In 1985, Alpha Air flying as an independent commuter airline was operating nonstop service to Los Angeles (LAX) with Cessna 402 twin prop aircraft. 

By the late 1980s, Alpha Air had introduced Beechcraft 1900C turboprops and was flying nonstop service to Los Angeles (LAX), Oakland (OAK) and San Jose (SJC).  In 1993, Alpha Air added direct service to Orange County Airport (SNA, now John Wayne Airport) as well. Alpha Air then became a Trans World Express air carrier via a code sharing agreement with Trans World Airlines (TWA) and was operating Beechcraft 1900C turboprop service on behalf of TWA nonstop to Los Angeles (LAX) and Burbank (BUR) during the early and mid-1990s. Another commuter airline, Sierra Mountain Airways, was operating flights from the airport in the late 1980s with service to Burbank (BUR), Fresno (FAT), Long Beach (LGB), Oakland (OAK), Ontario (ONT) and Reno (RNO) flown with small Beechcraft, Cessna and Rockwell Aero Commander prop aircraft.

Airlines and destinations

 Advanced Air operates Dornier 328JET regional jet aircraft provided by Taos Air on its new seasonal service. Previous passenger flights operated by Horizon Air on behalf of its corporate parent Alaska Airlines as well as seasonal United Express service operated by SkyWest Airlines on behalf of United Airlines in addition to service operated by JSX have all been either discontinued or realigned to the new air carrier.  In December 2021, all of the United Express service moved to nearby Eastern Sierra Regional Airport in Bishop, California, as the airline made a decision that MMH could no longer support scheduled commercial flights because of poor operational reliability primarily due to weather issues.

Statistics

Airline market share

References

External links

 Aerial image as of August 1999 from USGS The National Map
 

Airports in Mono County, California
Sierra Nevada (United States)